Acaponeta is both a municipality and a town in the northern part of the Mexican state of Nayarit. The population of the municipality was 34,665 in the 2005 census, living in a total area of 1,667.7 km² (643.9 sq mi). The population of the municipal seat was 18,066, the fifth-largest community in the state (after Tepic, Xalisco, Ixtlán del Río, and Tuxpan). The Acaponeta River flows through the town.

Acaponeta means, "Place near the river where the bean tangled in the  reed-grows"; which is formed by joining the translation of the Tepehuano word Acaponeta (Caponeta) which means, "place near the river"; and the Nahuatl Acatl-pol-etl-tlan, which means, "place where the bean tangled in the reed grows".

The climate is hot, subhumid, with the rainy season between June and September.  The average annual rainfall is 1,307 mm., of which 92% is registered in the months of July to September.  The average temperature is  26.7 °C. (80 °F)

The municipality is crossed by the Nogales, Sonora-Mexico City railroad and there is a station in the municipal seat.  Distances to some major cities are: Mazatlán 150.3 km. ; Tepic 166.2 km.; Mexicali 1,707.4 km. ; Mexico City 1,056.8 km.; Guadalajara 443.9 km.  See Ferromex

The economy of the region is heavily dependent on agriculture. The main crops are corn (maize), beans, sorghum, tobacco, chile, mangos and avocados.  There is a modest cattle herd as well as swine and poultry.

Industry is little developed and consists of small transformation industries.  The municipality has one of the oldest processing plants for corn flour as well as packing houses for mangos.

Agriculture employs over 40% of the economically active population, 41% are in services, and 16% in industry.  Due to the agricultural nature of the economy there is high sub-employment and subsequent immigration to the United States of America.

Mayor José Humberto Arellano Núñez (Morena) died of COVID-19 on June 18, 2020. The municipal government announced that starting June 18 it would return to the staggered closure of commercial activities and the total suspension of city council offices between June 15 and 28. Said measures were taken due to the high mortality rate in the municipality; of the 32 accumulated cases, 16 patients are still active, eight have recovered, and eight people have died.

Climate

Notables
Ali Chumacero – poet
Ramón Corona – general and diplomat

References

Link to tables of population data from Census of 2005 INEGI: Instituto Nacional de Estadística, Geografía e Informática
 Enciclopedia de los Municipios de México

External links
Radio XELH La Gran Estación de Acaponeta
Tips viajero Acaponeta

.

Populated places in Nayarit
Municipalities of Nayarit